Caldelas may refer to:
Caldelas (Amares), a former parish in Amares Municipality, Portugal
Caldas das Taipas, a parish in Guimarães Municipality, Portugal
Castro Caldelas, a municipality in the province of Ourense, Galicia, Spain
Ponte Caldelas, a municipality in the province of Pontevedra, Galicia, Spain
Terra de Caldelas, a comarca in the province of Ourense, Galicia, Spain